Bis(trimethylsilyl)acetamide (BSA) is an organosilicon compound with the formula Me3SiNC(OSiMe3)Me (Me = CH3).  It is a colorless liquid that is soluble in diverse organic solvents, but reacts rapidly with compounds, including solvents and moisture, containing OH and NH functional groups.  It is used in analytical chemistry for the derivatisation of compounds in analysis to increase their volatility, e.g. for gas chromatography.  It is also used to introduce the trimethylsilyl protecting group in organic synthesis. A related reagent is N,O-bis(trimethylsilyl)trifluoroacetamide (BSTFA).

Synthesis and reactions
BSA is prepared by treating acetamide with trimethylsilyl chloride in the presence of a base:
 2 Me3SiCl  + H2NC(O)Me  +  2 Et3N   →    Me3SiNC(OSiMe3)Me  +  2 Et3NHCl

The reaction of BSA with alcohols gives the corresponding trimethylsilyl ether, together with N-(trimethylsilyl)acetamide as a byproduct:
ROH  +  Me3SiNC(OSiMe3)Me   →   Me3SiN(H)C(O)Me  +  ROSiMe3

References 

Reagents for organic chemistry
Trimethylsilyl compounds